Udgir, is second largest city and municipal council in Latur district of the Indian state of Maharashtra. It is located in the Marathwada division of the state (one of the divisions of Maharashtra based on geographical conditions). The city is located very close to the borders of Karnataka and Telangana states. Udgir is home to the historical Udgir Fort. The town and nearby villages rely mainly on agriculture, which serves as a major source of income for the population.

Demographics
Udgir is a Taluka located in the Latur district of Maharashtra. It is one of the 10 Talukas of Latur District. There are 98 villages and 2 towns in Udgir Taluka.

As per the population census of 2011, Udgir Taluka has 56,806 households, and a population of 311,066 of which 161,568 are males and 149,498 are females. The population of children between the ages of 0-6 is 41,456 which is 13.33% of the total population.

The sex-ratio of Udgir Taluka is around 925 compared to 929 which is around the average of Maharashtra. The literacy rate of Udgir Taluka is 68.71% out of which 74.37% males and 62.6% females are literate. The total area of Udgir is 736.26 km2 with a population density of 422 per km2.

Out of its total population, 64.06% of the population lives in an urban area and 35.94% lives in a rural area. Marathi is the official language. Hindi & Urdu are also spoken.

The main source of income in Udgir Taluka comes from agriculture, shops and small scale industries. The town is popular for its inventory in food grains which is the result of high grain crop production in nearby villages.

History

Udgir is famous for the historic war between the Marathas and the Nizam, led by Sadashivrao Bhau, who defeated Nizam in 1759 when the treaty of Udgir was signed. Marathas won a convincing victory in the Battle of Udgir under the leadership of Sadashivrao Bhau. Later it prompted Peshwe (Peshwas) of Pune to elevate and designate him as Chief Commander of the Maratha army for the Third Battle of Panipat fought in 1761. Nevertheless, it was part of the Nizam's state until 1948 and the State of Hyderabad between 1948 and 1956 before being annexed to Bombay State.

Before the formation of Latur district, Udgir was part of Osmanabad district.

There are some old and popular places of worship located in the town and nearby which includes Shri Udalik Baba Temple, Shri Bodhan Aai Temple, Shri Somnathpur Temple, Shri Hawagi Swami Temple and Hazrath Khaja Sadharudeen Basha Dargha Sherif, which is about 400 years old. The town gets its name from the Saint Udalik or Udalik Baba who took Samadhi in the city's fort.

Transport

Rail
Udgir's railway station is connected by trains available from and to Hyderabad, Aurangabad, Pune, Mumbai, Bangalore, Latur, Nanded, Osmanabad, Kakinada and Tirupati. Udgir comes under the South Central Railways zone of the Indian Railways; it is part of the Secunderabad Division.

Road
Udgir is well-connected by roads with all major villages and cities in Maharashtra and nearby states. Maharashtra's bus services, commonly known as ST or Maharashtra State Road Transport Corporation, operate day and night buses in and out of the town, providing easy, overnight and safe connectivity. Interstate government transport buses are also available from and to Bidar and Hyderabad.
Private buses also run daily from and to major places like Mumbai , Pune &Aurangabad.

--} NH 50 Passes Through Udgir City & Connecting To NH 65 For Hyderabad

1) NH 63 Under Construction Start From  
Barshi, Latur, Renapur, Udgir, Degloor, To Nizamabad

Air
The nearest domestic airport is Shri Guru Gobind Sing Ji Airport,Nanded, Maharashtra which is at 100 km And
The nearest international airport, which is at 225 km from Udgir, is Rajiv Gandhi International Airport, Hyderabad, Telangana State, India.

Agriculture
The main occupation of the people of Udgir is agriculture. Udgir has farmers that make up the rural setting in most of the surrounding areas. The soil as a part of the Deccan plateau is black basalt soil, rich in hummus. The main crops cultivated here are whole grains, including jawar, bajra, and wheat. Crops like sorghum, mung, toor dal, urad gram, soybean, sugarcane, onions, and other green leafy vegetables are also cultivated.

A dairy was established in the early 1980s. It emerged as a major employment resource for rural Udgirkars. Due to gradually-lowered production, the dairy is at a standstill. It came under the state government-run project called Aarey which was institutionalized during the Operation Flood days.

Agriculture-based businesses like pulses (dal) industry, warehouses, cold storage, sugarcane factories also run here. Udgir has around 80 dal (mills) processing units.

Government Milk Scheme
Udgir has a skimmed milk powder plant established in 1978 and has capacity processing 1 lakh litres of dairy milk per day. Its conversion capacity is 10 M.T. S.M.P. per day.

Places of interest

Udgir Fort
Udgir Fort is a fort built in pre-Bahamani age, which dates from the twelfth century CE. It is also famous for its historic battle in which Marathas, led by Sadashivrao Bhau, defeated the Nizam, and after which the treaty of Udgir was signed. The fort is bounded by a 40-foot-deep trench, as the fort is built at ground level. In the fort are several palaces, Durbar halls and the grave of Udaygiri Maharaj which is 60 feet below ground level. It is rumoured that the Udgir fort has a direct subway deep underground connecting with Bhalki and the Bidar forts.

References

External links
 Udgir Taluka
Latur District

Cities and towns in Latur district
Hyderabad State
Talukas in Maharashtra
Cities in Maharashtra
Villages in Udgir taluka